John Maxwell Cohn (born February 9, 1959) is an American engineer.  Cohn is best known as the engineer scientist in the Discovery Channel TV show, The Colony. He is an IBM Fellow in at the MIT-IBM Watson AI Laboratory. Previous to that John was Chief Scientist of the  Internet of Things division. He holds an undergraduate electrical engineering degree from the Massachusetts Institute of Technology, as well as a doctoral degree from Carnegie Mellon University. Cohn has authored over 40 papers and has more than 120 worldwide patents.

Cohn's presentation concerning electricity, entitled Jolts and Volts, has been performed for more than 50,000 students world wide, including performances at Walt Disney World, and the New York Hall of Science.

In October 2013 Cohn was a presenter at a TEDx conference. TEDxDelft 2013 was themed "Do try this at home" and Cohn's talk was titled "The importance of play".

References

External links
 
 Presenting at Cusp Conference 2009 (video)

IBM Fellows
Living people
1959 births